All Is Well is a 1974 sculpture by Edward F. Fraughton commemorating Mormon pioneers, installed in Salt Lake City's Mormon Pioneer Memorial Monument, in the U.S. state of Utah.

References

1974 sculptures
Monuments and memorials in Utah
Outdoor sculptures in Salt Lake City
Sculptures of children in the United States
Statues in Utah